Orion Metcalf Barber (July 13, 1857 – March 28, 1930), frequently known as O. M. Barber, was a Vermont state politician and an associate judge of the United States Court of Customs and Patent Appeals.

Education and career

Born on July 13, 1857, in Jamaica, Vermont, Barber received a Bachelor of Laws in 1882 from Albany Law School and entered private practice in Bennington, Vermont. For many years, Barber's law partner was Charles Hial Darling.  Among the prospective attorneys who studied with Barber and Darling was Robert E. Healy, later an associate justice of the Vermont Supreme Court and a member of the United States Securities and Exchange Commission. A member of the Republican Party, Barber was state's attorney for Bennington County, Vermont from 1886 to 1887. He was a member of the Vermont House of Representatives from 1892 to 1894. He was a member of the Vermont Senate from 1894 to 1896. From 1894 to 1896, Barber served as a member of the state railroad commission. He was the Vermont Auditor of Accounts from 1898 to 1902. He was Chairman of the Vermont Special Tax Commission from 1906 to 1908. In 1909, he was Chairman of the Special Commission to Prepare and Publish the Digest of Reports of the Vermont Supreme Court.

Federal judicial service

Barber was nominated by President William Howard Taft on March 9, 1910, to the United States Court of Customs Appeals (United States Court of Customs and Patent Appeals from March 2, 1929), to a new Associate Judge seat authorized by 36 Stat. 11. He was confirmed by the United States Senate on March 30, 1910, and received his commission the same day. He assumed senior status on September 30, 1928. His service terminated on March 28, 1930, due to his death in Bennington. He was interred at Park Lawn Cemetery in Bennington.

Personal

On July 2, 1898, Barber married Alice Mabel "Mab" Norton (1868–1952) in Arlington, Vermont, and they were the parents of twin daughters and a son. Lucia Pierce Barber (August 24, 1899–September 30, 1984) was the wife of Clarence Edward Howard (April 16, 1881– April 4, 1975).  Mabel N. (August 24, 1899–May 13, 1991) was the wife of United States Army officer Notley Young DuHamel (1895–1970).  Norton (1903–1983) was an attorney who served in the Vermont House of Representatives and Vermont Senate, and was the husband of Marcia J. Stevens (1906–2004).

References

Sources
 

1857 births
1930 deaths
Burials in Vermont
Judges of the United States Court of Customs and Patent Appeals
Republican Party members of the Vermont House of Representatives
People from Bennington, Vermont
People from Jamaica, Vermont
State Auditors of Vermont
United States Article I federal judges appointed by William Howard Taft
20th-century American judges
Vermont lawyers
State's attorneys in Vermont
Republican Party Vermont state senators